Kulunu is a 1994 Maldivian drama film written and directed by Ali Waheed. Produced by Mapa, the film stars Aminath Muneera, Ismail Wajeeh and Aishath Shiranee in pivotal roles.

Synopsis
Rashid (Ismail Wajeed), a hardworking doctor goes to Addu upon the request of the government where he meets a dedicated nurse, Reema (Aminath Muneera) who spends all her time serving her ill mother. When her mother passes away, Rashid personally takes care of Reema and a romantic relationship begins between them. The couple plan their marriage while his family arranges his marriage with his childhood friend, Nasheedha (Aishath Shiranee).

Cast 
 Aminath Muneera as Reema
 Ismail Wajeeh as Rashid
 Aishath Shiranee as Nasheedha
 Koyya Hassan Manik as Hassan

Soundtrack

Accolades

References

Maldivian drama films
1994 films
1994 drama films
Dhivehi-language films